L'Homme presse may refer to:
The Man in a Hurry - a French novel from 1941 by Paul Morand (known in French as L'Homme pressé)
L'Homme Presse (horse) - a French thoroughbred racehorse